Pristimantis stictogaster is a species of frog in the family Strabomantidae.

It is endemic to Peru.
Its natural habitat is tropical moist montane forests.

References

stictogaster
Endemic fauna of Peru
Amphibians of Peru
Amphibians of the Andes
Frogs of South America
Amphibians described in 2005
Taxonomy articles created by Polbot